Brad Zellar (born November 16, 1961) is an American author and journalist. Zellar's writing often is accompanied by photographs; he has collaborated several times with photographer Alec Soth.  The Coen brothers film A Serious Man, nominated for the 2009 Academy Award for Best Picture, took some inspiration for the visuals based on Zellar's book the Suburban World: The Norling Photos. His book Conductors of the Moving World was named in Time "Best of 2011: The Photobooks We Loved", and was the recipient of the 2012 Photography for Design Professional Award from D&AD (British Design & Art Direction).

Biography

Childhood 
Zellar described his childhood as having grown up in "a very active and loving family" as well as being a fairly "social kid". At the same time, he notes that much of his work was inspired from his "lonely" adolescence despite having been in an always "crowded house". The desire for "privacy and solitude" brought about his affection for isolation amongst the "gravel roads surrounded by fields, and I loved to make that walk and have that feeling, that realization that it wasn't hard at all to disappear in this huge country". That realization, and his attention to "invisible people on the sidewalks of [Minneapolis]", largely influences his books. Jim Walsh summarized, "For 20 years, Zellar has made a career out of ferreting out some of the most fascinating characters that Minnesota's margins has to offer."

Zellar attended Banfield Elementary School in Austin, Minnesota. His father was a mechanic who owned a repair shop in Hollandale, Minnesota. Zellar noted that the 1985–86 Hormel strike deeply affected his hometown and ultimately his interests in covering the American Rust Belt.

Writer 
Zellar is a Twin Cities (Minneapolis–Saint Paul) journalist and author of several photography books. He has worked as a writer for the City Pages, the Utne Reader, and as literary critic and senior editor for The Rake. He has collaborated with Alec Soth on a number of books and photography projects such as The LBM Dispatches (Little Brown Mushroom). These dispatches include a series on Ohio, upstate New York, Michigan, California, Colorado, and Texas. The work focuses on a wide range of subjects, often characterized as “North American ramblings” ranging from the subject matter of individuals who live "off the grid" to the "Louisiana Goth scene".

In 2008, Zellar wrote Suburban World: The Norling Photos for the Minnesota Historical Society with a foreword by Soth. The book was a collection of the "complete photo negative and print archive" by Irwin Norling, an engineer at Honeywell and freelance photographer for the Bloomington, Minnesota police department. The book served as the visual inspiration for the Coen brothers' feature film A Serious Man. The film earned a Golden Globe nomination for Michael Stuhlbarg, a place on both the American Film Institute's and National Board of Review of Motion Pictures's Top 10 Film Lists of 2009, and a nomination for the Academy Award for Best Picture. The Coens, Joel Coen and Ethan Coen, "wanted to create the era when we grew up" and stated, "so we relied a lot on our memories", which was set in 1967 in Minnesota, the same era and location as Zellar's book.

Soth and Zellar collaborated again on Three Valleys in 2010. This was technically the fourth instalment of the LBM Dispatches located in California and centered on the Silicon Valley, San Joaquin Valley, and Death Valley. John Mahoney of American Photo Magazine noted the contrast in the landscapes as the "brave new worlds and pervasive virtuality of Silicon Valley, the Depression-era remnants of agricultural settlements and immigrant communities in the San Joaquin, and the other-worldly boom-and-bust landscapes of Death Valley, where the Manson Family holed up at the tail end of the 1960s."

Zellar also collaborated with Soth on the House of Coates that featured photographs by Lester B. Morrison. The story centres on Morrison who, during the record cold US winter of 2010/2011, stayed in hotels along U.S. Route 52. It was speculated by some that Morrison was in fact Soth, though both would later deny this and subsequently confirm they had both met Morrison.

In 2011, Zellar's book, Conductors of the Moving World was named in Time Best of 2011: The Photobooks We Loved. The book was the recipient of the D&AD 2012 Photography for Design Professional Award. He has also received awards from the Society of Professional Journalists, the Association of Alternative Newsmedia, and the Minnesota Magazine and Publishing Association.

Zellar and Soth's partnership has continued with dispatches to Ohio, Texas, California, Colorado, Michigan, New York, and Georgia as part of The LBM Dispatch series.

Zellar is also a noted blogger, having been a professional blog writer for City Pages and The Rake, and having found a popular audience in Ireland and Australia, according to Margaret A. Pribel of the Minnesota Magazine and Publishing Association.

Personal life 
Zellar is the brother of musician Martin Zellar, leader of the band Gear Daddies. Brad appears on the cover of the Gear Daddies album Billy's Live Bait as the 'Live Bait' attendant. He is an avid collector of baseball memorabilia. Among his prized collection is a rare "1911 first edition of the book 'Base Ball' by Albert Spalding" and  "a ball signed by Ted Williams and Mickey Mantle". Josh Ostergaard's book, The Devil's Snake Curve: A Fan's Notes from Left Field, references some of Zellar's baseball materials.

Zellar lived for a time in Austin, Minnesota, but has since moved to the Twin Cities.

Books 
Twin Cities Noir. New York: Akashic, 2006. . Edited by Julie Schaper and Steven Horwitz. Stories by Zellar and others.
Suburban World: The Norling Photos. Saint Paul, MN: Minnesota Historical Society; Borealis, 2008. . By Zellar, Irwin D. Norling, and Alec Soth.
The 1968 Project: A Nation Coming of Age. Saint Paul, MN: Minnesota Historical Society Press, 2011. . By Zellar and Soth.
Conductors of the Moving World. Saint Paul, MN: Little Brown Mushroom, 2011. . By Zellar and Eizo Ota.
Michigan. Saint Paul, MN: Little Brown Mushroom, 2012. . By Zellar and Soth.
Ohio. Saint Paul, MN: Little Brown Mushroom, 2012. . By Zellar and Soth.
Upstate New York. Saint Paul, MN: Little Brown Mushroom, 2012. By Zellar and Soth.
House of Coates. Photographs by Soth and Lester B. Morrison, text by Zellar.
Saint Paul, MN: Little Brown Mushroom, 2012. .
Coffee House, 2014. .
Aperture. New York: Aperture, 2012. . By Zellar and Melissa Harris.
Three Valleys. Saint Paul, MN: Little Brown Mushroom, 2013. By Zellar and Soth.
Driftless. Oakland, CA: TBW Books, 2018.  By Zellar and Jason Vaughn.

References

External links 

1961 births
Living people
American male journalists
Journalists from Minnesota
Place of birth missing (living people)